In the Hindu epic Mahabharata, Krishna is the son of the Yaduvamsha chief Vasudeva and his wife Devaki. He is also widely known by his epithet, Vāsudeva.

Krishna as a political reformer 

Krishna was the key political figure in overthrowing Kamsa, the king of Surasena Kingdom. The kingdom of Shurasena was the native kingdom of Yadava clans constituted by the Andhakas, Vrishnis, and Bhojas. By overthrowing Kansa, Krishna re-established the old king Ugrasena on the throne and stabilized the kingdom from collapse due to factional fighting within the kingdom.

The next threat came from outside the country, from the Magadha Kingdom. The ruler of Magadha, Jarasandha, attacked Surasena many times and weakened its military. Krishna and other Yadava chiefs all tried their best to hold on. At last, they had to flee from their native kingdom to the south and to the west.

Later, with the initiative of Krishna, the Yadavas who fled from Surasena formed a new kingdom called Dvaraka. Its capital was Dvaravati, a city well protected by mountains on all sides, on an island, not far from the Gujarat coast. This made it immune to attacks from land. The kingdom prospered by sea trade with seafaring kingdoms.

Krishna also established an alliance of Yadavas with the Pandavas, a faction of Kurus, who were fighting against the established Kuru Kingdom. This alliance also benefited the Yadavas, strategically. With the help of the Pandavas, they overthrew the Magadha king Jarasandha who was their biggest enemy. For this assistance, Krishna in turn helped the Pandavas to win the Kurukshetra War against the Kurus headed by Duryodhana. Thus the rule of the Pandava Yudhishthira was re-established by Krishna at Indraprastha, regarded to be modern-day Delhi.

However, The Yadava chiefs fought the Kurukshetra War, on both sides, and even after the war ended, the enmity among the Yadava leaders continued. After 36 years, since the Kurukshetra War, another war broke among the Yadavas, in their own kingdom. This resulted in the absolute destruction of the Yadava kingdom in Dvaraka, with Balarama and Krishna also departing due to grief. This fight among Yadava is also attributed to a curse from Gandhari, mother of Duryodhana to Krishna.

But the help Krishna extended to the Pandava Yudhishthira, paid off. When the rule of Yudhishthira ended, he established the Yadava prince Vajra on the throne of Indraprastha along with the Kuru prince Parikshit, at Hastinapura. Thus the royal lineage of the Yadavas continued through Aniruddha's son, Prince Vajra, great-grandson of Krishna and grandson of Pradyumna. Parikshit was the son of Abhimanyu and the grandson of Arjuna.

Preparations for the Kurukshetra War 

(Mahabharata, Book 5, Chapter 5) As we are desirous of adopting a political course, this is, no doubt, our first duty; a man acting otherwise would be a great fool. But our relationship to both the Kurus and the Pandus is equal, howsoever these two parties may behave with each other. If that chief of the Kuru race should make peace on equitable terms, then the brotherly feelings between the Kuras and the Pandus will sustain no injury. If on the other hand, the son of Dhritarashtra should wax haughty and from folly refuse to make peace, then having summoned others, summon us too. The holder of Gandiva then will be fired with wrath and the dull-headed and wicked Duryodhana, with his partisans and friends that will meet his fate.

Offer of aid in a war for both Arjuna and Duryodhana 
(Mahabharata, Book 5, Chapter 7) There is a large body of cowherds numbering ten lakhs, rivalling me in strength and known as the Narayanas, all of whom are able to fight in the thick of battle. These soldiers, irresistible in battle, shall be sent to one of you and I alone, resolved not to fight on the field, and laying down my arms, will go to the other. You may, first, select whichever of these two commends itself to you.

Peace mission to prevent the Kurukshetra War 
(Mahabharata, Book 5, Chapter 83) I will go to King Dhritarashtra, desirous of accomplishing what is consistent with righteousness, which may be beneficial to us, and what also is for the good of the Kurus.

Politics within the Yadava Chiefs 
(Mahabharata, Book 12, Chapter 80) I never behave with slavish obsequiousness towards my kinsmen by flattering speeches about their prosperity. I give them half of what I have and forgive their evil speeches. As a fire-stick is ground by a person desirous of obtaining fire, even so, my heart is ground by my kinsmen with their cruel speeches. Indeed, those cruel speeches burn my heart every day. Might reside in Sankarshana (Balarama); mildness in Gada; and as regards Pradyumna, he surpasses even me in the beauty of a person.  Although I have all these on my side yet I am helpless. Many others among the Andhakas and the Vrishnis are possessed of great prosperity and might and daring courage and constant perseverance. He on whose side they do not range themselves meets with destruction. He, on the other hand, on whose side they do range themselves, achieves everything. Dissuaded (in turns) by both (viz., Ahuka and Akrura,) I do not side with either of them. What can be more painful for a person than to have both Ahuka and Akrura on his side? What, again, can be more painful for one than not to have both of them on his side I am like the mother of two brothers gambling against each other, invoking victory to both. I am thus, afflicted by both.

Conquest of Eastern Kingdoms of Pragjyotisha and Shonitapura 
The epic Mahabharata describes many battles fought by Krishna and his conquest of various kingdoms. He defeated the king Naraka of Pragjyotisha the modern-day Guwahati, in Assam state of India. He was known as Bhumiputra (the son of the Earth) belonging to the Bhauma clan of kings. His kingdom was called Kamarupa.

He also conquered Bana or Vana of Shonitapura (Regarded to be Shonitpur of Assam), to the east of Pragjyotisha. However, they became allies, as Krishna's grandson Aniruddha married Usha, the daughter of Bana. He belonged to the daitya clan of the asuras.

In (Mahabharata, Book 5, Chapter 62), Krishna is described as the slayer of Vana and Bhumi's son (Naraka)

(Mahabharata, Book 5, Chapter 130) He hath slain Jarasandha, and Vakra, and Shishupala of mighty energy, and Vana in battle and numerous other kings also have been slain by him. Of immeasurable might, he vanquished king Varuna and also Pavaka and Indra and Madhu and Kaitabha and Hayagriva.

Conquest of Vidarbha, Gandhara, and Pandya 
(Mahabharata, Book 5, Chapter 48)...that Vāsudeva (Krishna), viz., who had mowed down in battle by main force all the royal warriors of the Bhoja race, had carried off on a single car Rukmini (princess of vidarbha) of great fame for making her his wife. and by her was afterwards born Pradyumna of high soul.

(Mahabharata, Book 7, Chapter 11) Krishna, vanquishing all the kings at a self-choice, bore away the daughter of the king of the Gandharas. Those angry kings, as if they were horses by birth, were yoked unto his nuptial car and were lacerated with the whip. 

(Mahabharata, Book 7, Chapter 23) The Pandya King Sarangadhwaja's country having been invaded and his kinsmen having fled, his father had been slain by Krishna in battle. Obtaining weapons then from Bhishma and Drona, Rama and Kripa, prince Sarangadhwaja became, in weapons, the equal of Rukmi and Karna and Arjuna and Achyuta. He then desired to destroy the city of Dvaraka and subjugate the whole world. Wise friends, however, from a desire of doing him good, counseled him against that course. Giving up all thoughts of revenge, he ruled his own dominions.

Krishna as a philosopher 

Krishna's philosophical conversation with his friend and cousin Arjuna during the Kurukshetra War later became known as the famous Bhagavad Gita, the holy book of Hindus. How he amassed this great knowledge is revealed in the Anugita chapters of Mahabharata, which states that he got this knowledge by interactions with many learned men, and by his own meditations. He also learnt from great teachers like Rishi Sandipani, Brihaspati etc.

The probable source of Krishna's knowledge 
Krishna mentions the knowledge he obtained from a certain Brahmana

(Mahabharata, Book 14, Chapter 16) On one occasion, a Brahmana came to us. Of irresistible energy, he came from the regions of Vrisha. He was duly reverenced by us. Listen to what he said, in answer to our inquiries. The Brahmana said, "That which you asked me, O Krishna, connected with the religion of Moksha (Emancipation), led by your compassion for all creatures and not for your own good,--that indeed, which destroys all delusion, O you that art possessed of supreme puissance I shall now tell you duly. Do you listen with concentrated attention as I discourse to you?"
[This inquiring is Krishna's Leela. This is also mentioned in the Chhandogya Upanishad.]

Extracts from Bhagavad Gita the Philosophy of Krishna 
(Mahabharata, Book 6, Chapter 26) There is no objective existence of anything that is distinct from the soul; nor non-existence of anything possessing the virtues of the soul. This conclusion in respect of both these hath been arrived at by those that know the truths of things. Know that the soul to be immortal by which all this [universe] is pervaded. No one can compass the destruction of that which is imperishable. It has been said that those bodies of the Embodied soul which is eternal, indestructible, and infinite, have an end.

(Mahabharata, Book 6, Chapter 26) As a man, casting off robes that are worn out, putteth on others that are new, so the Embodied (soul), casting off bodies that are worn out, entereth other bodies that are new. Weapons cleave it not, fire consumeth it not; the waters do not drench it, nor doth the wind waste it. It is incapable of being cut, burnt, drenched, or dried up. It is unchangeable, all-pervading, stable, firm, and eternal. It is said to be imperceivable, inconceivable, and unchangeable.

(Mahabharata, Book 6, Chapter 26) All beings (before birth) were unmanifest. Only during an interval (between birth and death), O Bharata, are they manifest; and then again, when death comes, they become (once more) unmanifest.

(Mahabharata, Book 6, Chapter 27) In this world, two kinds of devotion; that of the Sankhyas through knowledge and that of the yogins through work.

(Mahabharata, Book 6, Chapter 29) Arjuna said,--Thou applaudest, O Krishna, the abandonment of actions, and again the application (to them). Tell me definitely which one of these two is superior.
The Holy One said—Both abandonment of actions and application to actions lead to emancipation. But of these, application to action is superior to abandonment. He should always be known to be an ascetic who hath no aversion nor desire. For, being free from pairs of opposites, he is easily released from the bonds of action.

(Mahabharata, Book 6, Chapter 29) He who is wise never taketh pleasure in these that have a beginning and an end.

Evidence of early worship of Krishna 

The cult of Vāsudeva (later IAST  "Krishna-Vāsudeva")  is historically one of the earliest forms of worship in Krishnaism and Vaishnavism. This tradition is considered separately to other traditions that led to amalgamation at a later stage of the historical development, that form the basis of the current tradition of the monotheistic religion of Krishna. Some early scholars would equate it with Bhagavatism, and the founder of this religious tradition is believed to be Krishna, who is the son of Vasudeva, thus his name is Vāsudeva, and according to them his followers called themselves Bhagavatas and this religion had formed by the 2nd century BC (the time of Patanjali), or as early as the 4th century BC according to evidence of Pāṇini and that of Megasthenes and in the Arthashastra of Kautilya, when Vāsudeva was worshiped as supreme Deity in a strongly monotheistic format, where the Supreme Being was perfect, eternal and full of grace.
In many sources outside of the cult, devotee or bhakta is defined as Vāsudevaka. Harivamsa, a later addition to Mahabharata as well as Bhagavata Purana speak about his childhood in the village of Vrindavana, where Krishna passed his childhood and teenage days.

Notes and references

 Krishna
 Characters in the Mahabharata